"Every Day Is Exactly the Same" is the third and final single by American industrial rock band Nine Inch Nails from their album With Teeth. It is the twenty-first official Nine Inch Nails release. The commercial single was released on April 4, 2006, as an EP.

The radio single reached #1 on the Billboard Modern Rock singles chart in the Modern Rock Tracks category and #12 in the Mainstream Rock Tracks category. The song also reached number one on the Canadian Singles Chart, and received a nomination for Best Hard Rock Performance at the 49th annual Grammy Awards. "Every Day Is Exactly the Same" topped Billboard's 2006 year-end Hot Dance Singles Sales chart, and spent 104 weeks on the chart. A music video was planned but scrapped in the post-production stage.

Video

According to The Spiral, the music video for "Every Day Is Exactly the Same", directed by Francis Lawrence, was canceled in post-production. An image of a clapperboard and in the background what appeared to be water tank with a 3-lead ECG appeared on the official Nine Inch Nails website, but was later taken down.

There is also a studio cut video for the song. It can be seen on Beside You In Time.

Release and reception
Allmusic gave a generally favorable review of the EP, describing its various remixes as "actually better than the original versions".  Allmusic described the "Sam Fog vs. Carlos D Mix" of "Every Day Is Exactly the Same" as "sleekly ominous", and concluded that the track rendered "NIN's increasingly claustrophobic, insular music sound fresh again".  Pitchfork Media was not as positive towards the last mix, however, labeling it as the most disappointing track on the release and calling it "cold and ordinary". Pitchfork was more positive towards the other tracks however, labeling the El-P mix as "a harrowing (and somewhat cloying) experience" and concluding of the DFA mix that "the treatment works beautifully."

Use in popular culture
The song is featured in the 2008 film Wanted, where it became the film's most recognizable song.

This song is played in the CBS show Hawaii Five-0, in the beginning of the 15th episode of the third season, entitled "Hookman".

This song is played in the show Criminal Minds (first season, second episode, 1 minute 27 seconds in). The episode is titled "Compulsion".

The drum beats in the song are interpolated in "Wake Up" by a British Rock band The Vamps.

Formats and track listings
All songs by Trent Reznor.

U.S. CD EP

 "Every Day Is Exactly the Same" – 4:57
 "The Hand That Feeds" (DFA Mix) – 9:03
 "The Hand That Feeds" (Photek Straight Mix) – 7:47
 "Only" (El-P Mix) – 4:22
 "Only" (Richard X Mix) – 7:25
 "Every Day Is Exactly the Same" (Sam Fog vs. Carlos D Mix) – 5:03

Japan CD EP

 "Every Day Is Exactly the Same" – 4:57
 "The Hand That Feeds" (DFA Mix) – 9:03
 "The Hand That Feeds" (Photek Straight Mix) – 7:47
 "Only" (El-P Mix) – 4:22
 "Only" (Richard X Mix) – 7:25
 "Every Day Is Exactly the Same" (Sam Fog vs. Carlos D Mix) – 5:03
 "The Hand That Feeds" (Photek Dub Mix) – 7:52
 "Love Is Not Enough" (Live at Rehearsals) – 3:51

Promo 12"
(Remixes By Sam Fog And Carlos D. From Interpol)

 Everyday Is Exactly The Same – Main Mix – 5:03
 Everyday Is Exactly The Same – Edit – 4:09
 Everyday Is Exactly The Same – Full Vocals – 4:12

Promo CD

 Everyday Is Exactly The Same – Edit – 3:51
 Everyday Is Exactly The Same – Interpol Mix Edit – 4:09
 Everyday Is Exactly The Same – LP Version – 4:56

Personnel
Trent Reznor – vocals and various instruments
Dave Grohl – drums

Charts

Weekly charts

Year-end charts

References

External links
Nine Inch Nails official website

Nine Inch Nails songs
2006 singles
Canadian Singles Chart number-one singles
Music based on Nineteen Eighty-Four
Music videos directed by Francis Lawrence
Nothing Records singles
Interscope Records singles
Songs written by Trent Reznor
Song recordings produced by Trent Reznor
Song recordings produced by Alan Moulder
2004 songs
Songs about depression